Boudewijn Koole (born 1965) is a Dutch film director. In 2016, he won the Golden Calf for Best Director award for the film adaptation of the novel Beyond Sleep.

References

External links 
 

Living people
1965 births
Dutch film directors
Golden Calf winners